Tympanospinctus is a genus of mites in the family Spinturnicidae.

References

Rhodacaridae
Articles created by Qbugbot